Alireza Bavieh (born August 21, 2002) is an Iranian football midfielder who currently plays for Foolad in the Persian Gulf Pro League.

Club career

Foolad
He made his debut for Foolad in 4th fixtures of 2021–22 Persian Gulf Pro League against Naft Masjed Soleyman while he substituted in for Ahmad Aljabouri.

References

Living people
2002 births
People from Ahvaz
Association football midfielders
Iranian footballers
Foolad FC players
Persian Gulf Pro League players
Sportspeople from Khuzestan province